Matt Austin (born 30 March 1989) is an Australian rules footballer for the Brisbane Lions in the Australian Football League (AFL). He plays as a midfielder or half forward.

Austin was recruited from North Ballarat Rebels in the TAC Cup with the 56th selection in the 2007 AFL Draft. He made his AFL debut was in round 9 of the 2009 season against the Adelaide Football Club. Austin then played the next two matches, before being dropped.  He was recalled for the round 15 match against Geelong before missing the next few games with a back injury. Austin swapped his previous number 37 guernsey for number 8, vacated by the retired Tim Notting. After the 2010 AFL Season, Austin met BBC Celebrity Chef Ainsley Harriot overseas and developed a great friendship. Austin began learning kitchen craft and skills from Ainsley and was offered a TV spot on the UK version of Ready Steady Cook which he declined due to his AFL commitments. The pair still remain in contact to this day. He now plays for Northern Ballarat Roosters(North Melbourne Aligned VFL Team.

References

External links

1989 births
Living people
Brisbane Lions players
Stawell Football Club players
Australian rules footballers from Victoria (Australia)
Greater Western Victoria Rebels players
North Ballarat Football Club players